Havana Regional Airport (9I0) is a publicly owned public-use general aviation airport located 5 miles southeast of Havana, Illinois. The closest major airport to Havana is Peoria's General Downing International.

Havana Regional has one runway: runway 9/27 is 2235 x 100 feet and is made of turf.

While the airport's runway is turf, there is a paved parking area for aircraft. Fuel, courtesy cars, a lounge, restrooms, and showers are also available on site. The airport is home to EAA Chapter 1420.

For the 12-month period ending March 31, 2020, the airport averages 27 aircraft movements per week, or about 1400 per year. This traffic consists entirely of general aviation. For the same time period, there are 13 aircraft based on the field, all single-engine airplanes.

References

Airports in Illinois